Sandora LLC is a Ukrainian juice company based in Mykolaiv, Ukraine.  Founded in 1995, the company currently holds a 47 percent share of the Ukrainian juice market.  In September 2007, American-based PepsiCo, Inc. purchased 80 percent ownership of Sandora's company holdings. In November 2007, PepsiAmericas, Inc. and PepsiCo, Inc. jointly acquired the remaining 20% of Sandora. PepsiAmericas held a 60% interest in Sandora, and PepsiCo held 40% interest in Sandora. PepsiCo acquired PepsiAmericas in 2010 and took full ownership of Sandora.

See also 
 List of food companies

References

Drink companies of Ukraine
Mykolaiv
PepsiCo subsidiaries